Maganey Kel is a 1965 Indian Tamil language film directed by Mukta V. Srinivasan. The film stars S. S. Rajendran, C. L. Anandan, and Pushpalatha.

Plot

Soundtrack 
Music was composed by the duo Viswanathan–Ramamoorthy, while the lyrics were penned by Pattukkottai Kalyanasundaram.

References

External links 
 
 

1960s Tamil-language films
Films directed by Muktha Srinivasan
Films scored by Viswanathan–Ramamoorthy
Indian black-and-white films